Stéphanie d'Oustrac (born 1974, in Rennes) is a French mezzo-soprano.

Biography
Stéphanie d'Oustrac was born in Rennes in 1974. She is the great great niece of Francis Poulenc and Jacques La Presle.

She was part of the Maîtrise de Bretagne children's choir led by Jean Michel Noël. Her ambition was to be an actress before she switched to opera. She was a student of Oleg Afonine for nearly a year.

At the Conservatoire national supérieur de musique et de danse de Lyon she received the First Prize for Song in 1998 and was spotted by William Christie who worked with Les Arts Florissants. Under Christie and Marc Minkowski she expanded her repertoire to include Berlioz, Fauré and Britten.

From 1998 to 2012 she appeared in "starter roles" in quality productions, and from 2002 the title role as Armide, Atys (Jean-Baptiste Lully); Médée (Marc-Antoine Charpentier);  La Périchole, La belle Hélène (Jacques Offenbach); Carmen (Georges Bizet); L'Heure espagnole (Maurice Ravel); Pelléas et Mélisande (Claude Debussy).

She appeared at the Glyndebourne Festival Opera.
She also regularly gives chamber music concerts with various ensembles (The Paladins, The Arpeggiata, The Bergamasco, Il Seminario Musicale, Amaryllis).
She is also a soloist in recital.

Selected recordings

Marc-Antoine Charpentier : Médée H.491, Stéphanie d'Oustrac (Médée), François-Nicolas Geslot ( Jason), Gaëlle Méchaly ( Créuse), Bertrand Chuberre (Oronte), Le Concert Spirituel, conducted by Hervé Niquet, stage Director, Olivier Simonnet, directed by Olivier Simonnet DVD Armide Classics / Vox Lucida ARM 002, 2004.
 André Cardinal Destouches : Callirhoé, Cyril Auvity, Stéphanie d'Oustrac, Callirhoé, Cyril Auvity, Agénor, João Fernandes, Corésus, Ingrid Perruche, La Reine, Renaud Delaigue, Le Ministre, Stéphanie Révidat, Une Princesse de Calydon, Une Bergère, Le Concert Spirituel, conducted by Hervé Niquet. 2 CD Glossa 2007.
Maurice Ravel : L'Heure espagnole, L'Enfant et les Sortilèges, Stéphanie d'Oustrac, Concepcion, The Glyndebourne Chorus, London Philharmonic Orchestra, conducted by Kazushi Ono, Stage Director, Laurent Pelly. DVD Glyndebourne Fra Musica 2012.
Berlioz's Béatrice et Bénédict : Stéphanie d'Oustrac (Béatrice), Paul Appleby (Bénédict), Sophie Karthäuser (Héro), Lionel Lothe (Somarone), Philippe Sly (Claudio), Frédéric Caton (Don Pedro), Katarina Bradìc (Ursule), London Philharmonic Orchestra, The Glyndebourne Chorus, staged by Laurent Pelly, conducted by Antonello Manacorda. 1 DVD Opus Arte 2017
Emmanuel Chabrier : L'étoile, Stéphanie d'Oustrac, Lazuli, Hélène Guilmette, La princesse Laoula, Christophe Mortagne, Le Roi Ouf,  Jérome Varnier, Siroco, Choeur de l'Opéra national des Pays-Bas, Orchestre de la Résidence de La Haye, conducted by Patrick Fournillier, Stage Director, Laurent Pelly. DVD or Blu-ray Naxos 2019. Diapason d'or de l'année 2019.

References

External links
Stéphanie d'Oustrac at the Ambronay Festival
Concert Review: Stephanie d'Oustrac

1974 births
Living people
Musicians from Rennes
French operatic mezzo-sopranos
21st-century French singers
21st-century French women singers